The El Camino Ocho Tour was a concert tour through North America and Europe, undertaken by American rock band ZZ Top. The tour's concerts were performed in casinos and fairs from May through September 2008. Band members Billy Gibbons and Dusty Hill dressed in black biker jackets, along with baseball caps and boots. The El Camino Ocho Tour consisted of three legs and 60 shows. Some of the tour was depicted in the concert film Double Down Live.

Concert overview
Out of the 60 shows performed, each had a similar set list, with 16-21 songs performed. The concerts usually began with techno music played through the PA system, during which the band would walk on stage and begin the show.

Main set
The first leg of the tour opened with "Gimme All Your Lovin'", while the second and third legs opened with "Got Me Under Pressure." Following the opener, the band performed "Waitin' for the Bus", "Jesus Just Left Chicago", "Chevrolet", and "Pincushion." Every show featured "I'm Bad, I'm Nationwide", along with "Heard It on the X", "Just Got Paid", "I Need You Tonight", "Cheap Sunglasses", and "Planet of Women". "Sharp Dressed Man" and "Legs" were also included.

Encores
The encores typically started with "Tube Snake Boogie." This segued into a medley of "La Grange", "Sloppy Drunk Blues", and "Bar-B-Q." The encores usually closed out with "Tush." "Jailhouse Rock" was also occasionally performed.

Additional songs
A total of 24 different songs were played throughout the tour. "My Head's In Mississippi" was featured as a snippet for a few shows. "I Thank You" was played for the first nine concerts. "It's Only Love" from the Tejas album was eventually dropped from the main set due to technical errors.

Reception
Despite the fact that the band didn't have a new album to tour with, El Camino Ocho received generally positive reviews. Many reviews did state Gibbons' voice as being "gruff" or "throaty-sounding," and compared to "road gravel." His guitar playing, however, was well received by audiences. The Toronto Sun gave a rating of 4 out of 5 for the concert on August 24, 2008.

Post-tour

Double Down Live
The tour was filmed for future DVD release by Jamie Burton Chamberlin. In October 2009, Eagle Vision released Double Down Live, which combined footage from the tour, and featured 4 of the 11 songs being filmed during the tour. An interview was included in the DVD, filmed before the concert at Zénith de Paris.

Tour dates

References

External links
Peter Zurich's ZZ Top Gallery

ZZ Top concert tours
2008 concert tours